Andes Talleres Sport Club is a football club in the city of Godoy Cruz, in Mendoza (Argentina), founded on July 9, 1933.

Play as a local in Ingelmo Nicolás Blázquez Stadium, which has an approximate capacity to accommodate 10,000 spectators.

Currently playing in the Federal C Tournament.

History 

It was born from the merger of the Athletic Club Tracción and Talleres Pacífico (founded on February 1, 1932), the merger was carried out on January 1, 1933, in an assembly called for that purpose, and an anniversary date was established on September 9, 1932. July 1933. We can say that 3 were the emblematic sports that throughout its history highlighted it at provincial, national and international level. These were football, basketball and roller hockey.

After competing for several seasons in the Indoor Tournament making outstanding campaigns, in 2012 he is invited to the Argentino B by the Federal Council, because the latter decides to reformulate the tournament with the creation of zones, which imply a true regionalization of the same , with a form of dispute more appropriate sporting and economically. For what the Azulgrana institution happens to integrate the zone of mendocinos along with Gimnasia y Esgrima, Guaymallén, Huracán Las Heras and San Martín (who already were in this tournament) and Gutiérrez, Huracán of San Rafael and Pacífico Sport Club (who were also invited). Between 2009 and 2012 he was one of the most outstanding clubs from Mendoza in the Indoor Tournament. He stands out as his top scorer an impressive 11-0 in his stadium against Fernández Alvarez (Tunuyán) in the framework of the group stage of the 2009 Indoor Tournament. His great infrastructure was one of the pillars that led to the Federal Council of AFA invite him to play the Argentino B 2012/2013, added to his very good football campaigns. However, the results did not accompany the virtuosity of the club during that championship and now he will have to play the Tournament of the Interior 2014, after his recent descent, in which he finished last in Group C behind the also descended Sportivo Atenas (Río Cuarto) and Huracán Las Heras.

Rivalries
Andes Talleres's classic rival is Godoy Cruz Antonio Tomba, a neighborhood classic that has not been played since 1993, thanks to the "Azulgrana" promotions and the "Tomba" football debacle.

In addition, Andes Talleres has provincial classics such as Leonardo Murialdo and Gutiérrez Sport Club.

International friendly 

In 1970 Andes Talleres plays an international friendly in which it loses 2-0 before the Flamengo. On June 7, 1979, Andes Talleres played a friendly match with AC Milan of Italy, which won 3-2. In that party there were special guests like Roberto Perfumo. This has been the very last game played by Milan's mighty captain and Italy's international Gianni Rivera

Honours

Regional
 Mendoza Football League (4): 1946, 1955, 1956, 1971.

References

External links

Official website 

Association football clubs established in 1933
Football clubs in Mendoza Province
Basketball teams in Argentina
Argentine roller hockey clubs
Argentine handball clubs
1933 establishments in Argentina
Basketball teams established in 1933